Henry Bright may refer to:

Henry Bright (schoolmaster, born 1562) (1562–1627), English priest and schoolmaster at the King's School, Worcester
Henry Bright (schoolmaster, born 1724) (1724–1803), English priest and schoolmaster at Abingdon School and New College School
Henry Bright (MP) (1784–1869), MP for Bristol
Henry Bright (painter) (1810–1873), English painter
Henry Arthur Bright (1830–1884), English merchant and author
Henry Edward Bright (1819–1904), member of the South Australian colonial parliament